Charmaine Reid (born November 3, 1973) is a Canadian badminton player. Her home is in Calgary. Her coaching has been by Bryan Moody (a Canadian champion), Ardy Wiranata (Indonesian working in Canada and former World Champion), and Ken Poole (past president of the Canadian Badminton Coaches' Association). In 2004, she competed at the Summer Olympics in Athens in both singles and doubles. Reid won five Canadian National Championships between 2005 and 2007, two of them in women's singles, and three in women's doubles. She has won one gold and four silver medals at the Pan American Games. In 2016, she was inducted into Niagara Falls Sports Wall of Fame in recognition of her accomplishments and contribution to the sport of badminton around the world.

Achievements

Pan American Games 
Women's singles

Women's doubles

Pan Am Championships 
Women's singles

Women's doubles

World Grand Prix 
The World Badminton Grand Prix was sanctioned by the International Badminton Federation from 1983 to 2006.

Women's singles

Women's doubles

BWF International Challenge/Series 
Women's singles

Women's doubles

Mixed doubles

  BWF International Challenge tournament
  BWF International Series tournament
  BWF Future Series tournament

References

External links 
 Badminton Canada page for Charmaine Reid
 

1973 births
Living people
Sportspeople from Niagara Falls, Ontario
Canadian female badminton players
Badminton players at the 2004 Summer Olympics
Olympic badminton players of Canada
Badminton players at the 1999 Pan American Games
Badminton players at the 2003 Pan American Games
Badminton players at the 2007 Pan American Games
Pan American Games gold medalists for Canada
Pan American Games silver medalists for Canada
Pan American Games medalists in badminton
Badminton players at the 2006 Commonwealth Games
Badminton players at the 1998 Commonwealth Games
Medalists at the 1999 Pan American Games
Medalists at the 2003 Pan American Games
Medalists at the 2007 Pan American Games
Commonwealth Games competitors for Canada
20th-century Canadian women
21st-century Canadian women